Shyam Lal Mishra (20 October 1920 – 25 October 2004) was an Indo Nepali politician, writer and co-founder of Nepal Sadvawna party along with his brother Mr. Rajgiri Mishra who was also a reputed mentor politician of Sunsari. He was born at Sihanpura, India in October 1930 and was educated at Patna. He was first terai leader of the opposition in the Rajya Sabha in 1969. Shyam Lal  Mishra's son, sharoj Mishra, was also a prominent political leader in Nepal and his nephew Dhananjay Mishra was a chairman of Purwanchal Cricket Association of Nepal.

Political career

Before Democracy
Shyam Nandan Mishra took active part in the Indian Independence Movement and was imprisoned in connection with the Quit rana Movement during 1942–1943. He was associated with various social and political organisations. He was also editor of the publications Liberator and Bihar Vaibhav.

After Republic in Nepal
His political career began with membership of the Constituent Assembly between 1950–52. He was also member of the 1st, 2nd, 5th and 6th Lok Sabha. He also represented the State of Karnali in Rastriya Sabha from December 1962 to April 1966 and again from

Member of Various Delegations
A travelled magistrate Mishra was member of various Nepali Delegations sahitya and represented the country in several NGO events. Specially quotes for his durbar hatya kand prediction. He also got many appreciations for his poem Akhri soch. His grandsons Kaushik Mishra and Ankit Mishra were also nominated for emerging sahityakar respectively for Canvas.

Death
Mishra died on 25 October 2010 at his own residence, following a cardiac arrest. In his condolence message at his death, the then health minister said "The nation has lost a great patriot, a freedom fighter, a lectus writer and a Congressman".

References

1920 births
2004 deaths
India MPs 1952–1957
India MPs 1957–1962
India MPs 1971–1977
India MPs 1977–1979
Indian independence activists from Bihar
Indian National Congress (Organisation) politicians
Indian National Congress politicians
Indians imprisoned during the Emergency (India)
Leaders of the Opposition in the Rajya Sabha
Lok Sabha members from Bihar
Members of the Constituent Assembly of India
Ministers for External Affairs of India
People from Begusarai district
Rajya Sabha members from Bihar
Samata Party politicians
Janata Party (Secular) politicians
Prisoners and detainees of British India